The 1922 German Ice Hockey Championship was the sixth season of the German Ice Hockey Championship, the national championship of Germany. Three teams participated in the championship, and MTV Munchen 1879 won the title.

Final standings

References

External links
German ice hockey standings 1912-1932

Ger
German Ice Hockey Championship seasons
1921–22 in German ice hockey